Skakavac is a village in the municipality of Bosanski Petrovac, Bosnia and Herzegovina.

Demographics 
According to the 2013 census, its population was 22, all of whom were Serbs.

References

Populated places in Bosanski Petrovac
Villages in the Federation of Bosnia and Herzegovina